The Dubringer Moor, is a nature reserve (NSG) in the Bautzen district in northern Saxony.

Importance for conservation

Fauna 
Dubringer Moor is an important breeding area for threatened bird species. Those on Saxony's red list (categories 1 and 2) are.
 Hobby
 Snipe
 Kingfisher
 Grey-headed woodpecker
 Woodlark
 Lapwing
 Kleine Ralle
 Crane
 Shoveler
 Great grey shrike
 Red-backed shrike
 Bittern
 Marsh harrier
 Red kite
 Sedge warbler
 Black kite
 Black woodpecker
 White-tailed eagle
 Barred warbler
 Spotted crake
 Wryneck
 Honey buzzard
 Nightjar

External links 

 Projects in the Dubringer Moor Nature Reserve by the NABU branch at Wittichenau
 

Nature reserves in Saxony
Bogs of Saxony
BDubringer Moor
Geography of Lusatia
Bernsdorf, Upper Lusatia
Hoyerswerda
Wittichenau
Special Areas of Conservation in Germany